The Choir of King's College London is a mixed-voice choir whose primary function is to lead services in the Renaissance Revival chapel of King's College London. Since its revival in 1945, the choir has gained an international reputation as one of the leading university collegiate choirs in the world.

History 
Founded around 1843 by William Henry Monk, it was noted that certain gentlemen connected with King's had... been efficiently supplying the choir.From 1945–1952, the choir was directed by Harold Last, then to E.H. Warrell who held an extensive 38 year tenure. David Trendell was then appointed, directing the choir for 22 years. Following the sudden death of Trendell, Gareth Wilson was temporarily appointed for one year. He was succeeded by the choir's current director of music, Joseph Fort.

Directors of Music 
Since 1945 the choir has been conducted by the director of music, also the appointed college organist and lecturer in music.

 1945–1952: Harold Last
 1953–1991: E.H. Warrell
 1992–2014: David Trendell
 2014–2015: Gareth Wilson (acting)
 2015–present: Joseph Fort

Membership of the choir 
The choir normally consists of between 25 and 30 singers, most of whom are undergraduate students reading Music. 

A choral scholar also serves as the choir's librarian who works alongside the choir administrator.

Organ scholar 
The organ is played by the organ scholar who is typically also an undergraduate student. If the director of music is not present for any reason, an organ scholar takes responsibility for conducting the choir.

The current organ scholar is Mitchell Farquarson.

Services 
The choir usually sings in the King's College London Chapel twice a week:

 5:30 p.m. on Tuesdays for choral evensong
 1:15 p.m. on Wednesdays for college eucharist

Most famed for their Advent Carols Services, the choir performs across three nights to meet demand. The choir also sings in extra services such as All Souls and Ash Wednesday Vigils, remembrance and memorial services. Many members of the choir also sing with the neighbouring St Mary le Strand church.

Since 2020, the choir started livestreaming services on their YouTube channel as a result of the COVID-19 pandemic.

Performances and recordings 
The choir maintains a strong recording and touring schedule, having previously performed as far afield as Italy, Nigeria and Hong Kong. The choir also performs regularly in major concert venues and holds numerous appearances at music festivals across the country.

Tours and performances 
Aside from sacred music sung mostly in choral evensong services, the choir also performs a wide range of music, including contemporary mass settings and choral works by Eleanor Alberga, Charles Stanford, Herbert Howells, and Imogen Holst, with the choir having recently sung the world première of Ed Nesbit's (one of the college composition lecturer's) The King's Service.

The choir often performs with symphony orchestras both within the United Kingdom and abroad, with the ensemble giving the world première of Simon Rowland-Jones's Smile, O voluptuous cool-breath’d Earth! alongside the Orion Orchestra in November 2020. In April 2021 the choir performed the St John Passion with the Hanover Band, with other performing engagements including multiple concerts featuring the Rachmaninoff All-Night Vigil as part of the Barnes Music Festival and at St John's Smith Square.

Tours in recent years have seen the choir perform in the US (2019), Nigeria (2018), US and Canada (2017), Germany (2016), and Italy (2015).

Recordings 
{{External media|float=center|width=330px|audio1=You may listen to the Choir of King's College London conducted by Joseph Fort performing the conductor's own chamber arrangement of Gustav Holst's The Cloud Messenger in 2019  on classicalmusicsentinel.com}}
Since 2009, the choir has primarily recorded a number of critically acclaimed recordings with Delphian. Repertory ranges from more traditional Anglican worship music including music from Byrd and Palestrina to premièring the works of contemporary composers such as Kerensa Briggs.

Under the baton of Trendell, the choir enjoyed a relationship with the Choir of Gonville and Caius College, Cambridge, where they released multiple albums together with Delphian. The choir has also worked with a number of instrumental ensembles and guest artists, most recently with Sean Shibe for the choir's release of Say it to the Still World and with the Strand Ensemble for The Cloud Messenger.

 Discography 
Previously having worked with Hyperion, Gaudeamus and Herald AV Publications, the choir now records exclusively with Delphian.

 2009 - Shchedrin: The Sealed Angel (DCD34067-CD)
 2012 - Allegri: Miserere; Masses & Motets (DCD34103-CD)
 2013 - Deutsche Motette (DCD34124-CD)
 2014 - Desenclos: Messe de Requiem, Salve Regina, Motets (DCD34136-CD)
 2016 - In Memoriam - A Tribute to David Trendell (DCD34146-CD)
 2017 - Brahms: An English Requiem (DCD34195-CD)
 2019 - Masses for Double Choir (DCD34211-CD)
 2019 - Advent Carols (DCD34226-CD)
 2020 - The Cloud Messenger (DCD34241-CD)
 2021 - Say it to the Still World (DCD34246-CD)
 2022 - Edward Nesbit: Sacred Choral Music (DCD34256)
 2023 - Rachmaninoff: Vespers - All-Night Vigil (DCD34296)

Some previous recordings include:

 2000 - John Tavener and William Byrd 2002 - Alonso Lobo: Choral Music (CDGAU311)
 2003 - O Sapientia: Advent from King's College London'' (HAVP296)

Awards and nominations

References

External links 
 
 YouTube channel
 Spotify channel

King's College London
University choirs
1843 establishments in England
Musical groups established in 1843
English choirs
Musical groups from London